The Pacific Century (and the associated term Asia-Pacific Century) is a term that has been used to describe the 21st century through analogy with the term American Century. The implicit assumption underlying the usage of the term is that the 21st century will be dominated, especially economically, by countries in the Asia-Pacific region and major economies on the Pacific, most dominantly China (both the People's Republic and Taiwan) ASEAN countries, Japan, South Korea, India, New Zealand and Australia, and to an extent, the United States. This idea can be compared to the historical Eurocentric/Atlantic viewpoint, which has dominated for the past two centuries.

The term Asian Century is a more popularized term, shifting greater emphasis towards Asia, especially on the potential superpowers of Mainland China and India. Cities in those countries, such as Tokyo, Mumbai, Beijing, Kuala Lumpur, Jakarta, Manila, Singapore, Seoul, Hong Kong, Shanghai, Delhi, and Bangkok are increasingly gaining power as financial hubs, displacing cities in Europe. Some also predict that the balance of world power will shift to China to the extent the PRC becomes a superpower and prefer the term Chinese Century.

A 10-hour documentary entitled The Pacific Century was aired on PBS in 1992, which covered the history of modern Asia and the West, as well as the future of the region.

In a November 2011 article for Foreign Policy, the term was recast as America's Pacific Century by US Secretary of State Hillary Clinton to succinctly describe the leading US foreign-policy goal of the 21st century. Acknowledging discussion of the rising threat to American power in the region from rapidly developing Pacific nations, most obviously China, Clinton said: "One of the most important tasks of American statecraft over the next decade will therefore be to lock in a substantially increased investment—diplomatic, economic, strategic, and otherwise—in the Asia-Pacific region." President Barack Obama also toured various countries that month to bolster security alliances and work on a new trade bloc called the Trans-Pacific Partnership, from which China is excluded. The US was ASEAN's largest trading partner in 2004; by 2012 China was the biggest trading partner of ASEAN by far, as well as the biggest of Japan, Korea, India, New Zealand and Australia.

Clinton's remarks were translated into official policy at the start of 2012, as the Obama administration outlined a new China-centric military strategy. The preceding year, Clinton had already "grabbed Beijing's lapels" by declaring the South China Sea as a vital American interest. The policy shift was denounced by Chinese state media, which declared that the Americans should not "recklessly practice militarism", nor engage in "war mongering". Unease from SE Asian countries at the militaristic rhetoric from the US led to a trip by Clinton in July 2012, which aimed to extend economic ties to South East Asian countries that are becoming increasingly bound by trade with China, being spun as an adjustment to focusing more on economic issues. One indication of the comprehensiveness of the new American effort was Clinton's visit to Laos, the first by a US Secretary of State since John Foster Dulles in 1955. The end of summer 2013 saw US Defense Secretary Chuck Hagel forcefully lobbying the Philippines, a nation of major strategic importance, to permit a rotating American troop force to return to the country, an arrangement that would provide a fillip to the US military presence in the region. The rotating troop discussion was part of a broader framework agreement being negotiated by Washington and Manila that, if agreed, would permit American forces to operate out of Filipino military bases. The US response to the destruction visited on the Philippines by Typhoon Haiyan in November 2013 evidenced the rapidly expanding military alliance between the two countries.
__notoc__

References

Further reading

See also
Indo-Pacific

External links
 Former Australian PM Kevin Rudd discusses the Asia-Pacific Century at the Asia Society (January 2012)

21st century in Oceania
History of Oceania
Rises to prominence